The 1997–98 Latvian Hockey League season was the seventh season of the Latvian Hockey League, the top level of ice hockey in Latvia. Five teams participated in the league, and HK Nik's Brih Riga won the championship.

Standings

External links
 Season on hockeyarchives.info

Latvian Hockey League
Latvian Hockey League seasons
Latvian